was a daimyō during mid-Edo period Japan.

Biography
Matsudaira Nobunao was the eldest son of Matsudaira Nobutoki, the daimyō of Yoshida Domain in Mikawa Province. On the death of his father on June 44, 1744, he became daimyō of Hamamatsu Domain and head of the Ōkōchi-branch of the Matsudaira clan. A few days later, his courtesy title changed to Izu-no-kami. On October 15, 1752, he was transferred to Yoshida Domain.

Nobunao died on November 1, 1768 in Yoshida.

References 
 Papinot, Edmund. (1906) Dictionnaire d'histoire et de géographie du japon. Tokyo: Librarie Sansaisha...Click link for digitized 1906 Nobiliaire du japon (2003)
 The content of much of this article was derived from that of the corresponding article on Japanese Wikipedia.

|-

|-

Fudai daimyo
Ōkōchi-Matsudaira clan
1719 births
1768 deaths